The 1958 U.S. Open was the 58th U.S. Open, held June 12–14 at Southern Hills Country Club in Tulsa, Oklahoma. Amid oppressive heat and high winds that created difficult scoring conditions, native Oklahoman Tommy Bolt won his only major championship, four strokes ahead of Gary Player. It was Player's debut in the U.S. Open at age 22.

Bolt owned the 36-hole lead at 142 (+2), a stroke ahead of Player.  After a third round 69 on Saturday morning, Bolt was at 211 (+1) and three strokes ahead of Gene Littler, who carded a 67 for 214 (+4). Littler fell back in the final round in the afternoon, shooting a 76 to finish in fourth place. Bolt ran away from the field with a final round 72 for 283 (+3), four ahead of Player. Bolt was the only player not to record a round of 75 or over during the championship.

Ben Hogan, in search of his fifth U.S. Open title, was hampered by an injured left wrist and finished eleven strokes back in a tie for tenth. Eighteen-year-old Jack Nicklaus, in his second U.S. Open, made his first cut and finished in 41st place. Sam Snead missed the cut for the first time in 18 Open appearances. Two-time champion Gene Sarazen missed the cut in his final appearance, while three-time Masters champion Jimmy Demaret also played his final Open, withdrawing after the third round.

It was the first of eight major championships at Southern Hills.  The U.S. Open returned in 1977 and 2001 and the PGA Championship has been played at the course five times: 1970, 1982, 1994, 2007 and 2022.

Course layout

Past champions in the field

Made the cut 

Source:

Missed the cut 

Source:

Round summaries

First round
Thursday, June 12, 1958

(a) denotes amateur
Source:

Second round
Friday, June 13, 1958

(a) denotes amateur
Source:

Third round
Saturday, June 14, 1958   (morning)

(a) denotes amateur
Source:

Final round
Saturday, June 14, 1958   (afternoon)

Source:

References

External links
USGA Championship Database
USOpen.com – 1958

U.S. Open (golf)
Golf in Oklahoma
Sports in Tulsa, Oklahoma
U.S. Open
U.S. Open
U.S. Open